Dolgoma fukienica is a moth of the family Erebidae. It is found in Fujian in south-eastern China.

References

Moths described in 1954
Dolgoma